USS K-6 (SS-37) was a K-class submarine of the United States Navy.  Her keel was laid down by the Fore River Shipbuilding Company in Quincy, Massachusetts, under a subcontract from the Electric Boat Company of Groton, Connecticut.  She was launched on 26 March 1914, sponsored by Mrs.  Thomas Gaines Roberts, and commissioned on 9 September at Boston, Massachusetts.

Service history
Steaming to Newport, Rhode Island, on 16 November, K-6 joined the 4th Division, Atlantic Torpedo Flotilla, for shakedown and training. For almost three years, she conducted experimental and development operations along the Atlantic coast and in the Gulf of Mexico. She underwent diving tests off Cape Cod and Long Island, practiced firing torpedoes in Chesapeake Bay; and participated in tactical submarine exercises out of New London, Connecticut, Key West, Florida, and Pensacola, Florida. Following overhaul at Philadelphia, Pennsylvania, she departed New London on 12 October 1917, and steamed via Halifax, Nova Scotia, for patrol duty in the Azores.

K-6 arrived Ponta Delgada, Azores, on 27 October in company with three other K-class submarines. For more than a year they patrolled the surrounding ocean, searching for U-boats and surface raiders and preventing them from using the islands as a haven. After the surrender of Germany, K-6 sailed for the United States on 21 November arriving Philadelphia via Bermuda on 13 December. After overhaul, K-6 proceeded to New London on 28 May 1919, to resume development and tactical operations along the New England coast.

During the four years of service that followed, K-6 ranged the Atlantic from New England to the Caribbean Sea. Operating primarily out of New London, Hampton Roads, and Key West, she trained prospective submariners, conducted experimental dives and underwater maneuvers and proved the value of submarines as an effective part of the Navy.  Arriving Hampton Roads from New London 21 March 1923, K-6 decommissioned on 21 May. Subsequently, she was towed to Philadelphia on 13 November 1924. Her name was struck from the Naval Vessel Register on 18 December 1930. She was broken up and sold for scrapping on 3 June 1931.

Notes

References

External links
 

United States K-class submarines
World War I submarines of the United States
Ships built in Quincy, Massachusetts
1914 ships